Ronald R. Hein (November 7, 1949 – December 21, 2022) was an American lobbyist and politician who served as a Republican in the Kansas State Senate from 1977 to 1984, and in the Kansas House of Representatives from 1975 to 1976.

Hein was born in Seneca, Kansas, and was active in student government and politics during his childhood. He studied political science at Washburn University, and immediately entered law school at Washburn University School of Law. He ran for the Kansas House in 1974, while also studying for the bar exam, and won a seven-way primary with 35% of the vote. He won the general election with relative ease, and served in the House for one term.

In 1976, he successfully challenged fellow Republican Bob Storey in the primary for the 20th district in the Kansas Senate. He served two terms there, and declined to run for re-election due to a desire for higher salary. He unsuccessfully ran for a seat in the United States House of Representatives in 1978. Hein was succeeded in the state senate by fellow Republican Alicia Salisbury. Hein founded a lobbying firm after leaving office.

Hein died at the University of Kansas Hospital on December 21, 2022, at the age of 73.

References

1949 births
2022 deaths
20th-century American politicians
Politicians from Topeka, Kansas
Washburn University alumni
Washburn University School of Law alumni
Republican Party Kansas state senators
Republican Party members of the Kansas House of Representatives
American lobbyists
People from Seneca, Kansas
Candidates in the 1978 United States elections